Leo Daniel Kavanagh (August 9, 1894 in Chicago, Illinois – August 10, 1950 in Chicago, Illinois) was a shortstop for the Chicago Federals professional baseball team in 1914.

External links

1894 births
1950 deaths
Chicago Whales players
Major League Baseball shortstops
Baseball players from Chicago